AWW may refer to:

 Algers, Winslow and Western Railway (US railroad reporting mark), Indiana, US
 Antwerp Water Works, Belgium